Nelson Lucas (born 30 June 1979) is a Seychellois former sprinter.

Running in the men's 100 metres at the 2000 Summer Olympics in Sydney, he finished ninth in heat eleven of the qualifications with a time of 11.15 seconds and did not progress to the semi-finals. Lucas was a member of the 4x100 relay squad which set the Seychellois national record at the 1998 Indian Ocean Island Games in Saint-Paul, Réunion.

References

1979 births
Living people
Seychellois male sprinters
Olympic athletes of Seychelles
Athletes (track and field) at the 2000 Summer Olympics